Edward Keith Brown is a Scottish linguist, professor at the University of Cambridge, and the editor-in-chief of the Encyclopedia of Language and Linguistics.

Life
After studying English at Cambridge University, he joined the British Council, and then worked in
Uganda. Afterward he taught at the University College of Cape Coast in Ghana, before moving to Edinburgh, where he received his Ph.D. in linguistics in 1972.

In 1984 he moved to the University of Essex, where he was research professor in the Department of Linguistics, and then to the University of Cambridge, where he was senior research fellow in the Research Centre for English and Applied Linguistics. As at 2014 he is an Affiliated Lecturer in the Department of Theoretical and Applied Linguistics, and a fellow of Pembroke College, Cambridge.

He has also held visiting professorships at the Universities of Heidelberg, Vienna, and Düsseldorf. In the period of 1990-1994 he was the president of the Linguistics Association of Great Britain, and also a member of Council of the Philological Society since 1998. He is chairman of the Linguistics Committee of the Subject Centre for Languages, Linguistics and Area Studies.

Works
He serves as a co-editor of Transactions of the Philological Society and sits on several other editorial boards. He is author of Linguistics Today (Fontana, 1984) and co-author, with Jim Miller, of Syntax: A Linguistic Introduction to Sentence Structure and Syntax: Generative Grammar (Hutchinson, 1981).

He was syntax editor for the first edition of the Encyclopedia of Language and Linguistics and was joint editor, with Jim Miller, of A Concise Encyclopedia of Linguistic Theories and A Concise Encyclopedia of Grammatical Categories (Pergamon Press, 1997 and 1998). He was also a joint editor of Common Denominators in Art and Science (Aberdeen University
Press, 1983), as well as Language, Reasoning and Inference (Academic Press, 1986).

References

 

Fellows of Pembroke College, Cambridge
Alumni of the University of Cambridge
Alumni of the University of Edinburgh
Linguists from the United Kingdom
Living people
Linguists of Muskogean languages
Year of birth missing (living people)